"ISU Fights" is the fight song of Iowa State University. It is often played at sporting events, and otherwise it is mostly only sung by the Iowa Statesmen, the official men's choir of Iowa State, which generally sings the song at the end of their concerts, as part of a collection of school songs, starting with "Rise, Sons of Iowa State," "For I, For S, For Ever," the alma mater "Bells of Iowa State," and then finally "ISU Fights." These songs are often collectively referred to as the Iowa State Fight Songs, though "ISU Fights" is the official fight song." The song was written in the 1930s by Paul Gnam, a brother of Sigma Alpha Epsilon fraternity.

Lyrics

External links
Lyrics to ISU Fights and Bells of Iowa State

American college songs
College fight songs in the United States
Big 12 Conference fight songs
Iowa State Cyclones
Iowa State Cyclones traditions